Walter Hobhouse (5 April 1862 – 30 October 1928) was an eminent Anglican priest and author in the late nineteenth and early twentieth centuries.

The second son of Bishop Edmund Hobhouse he was born on 5 April 1862 and educated at Eton and New College, Oxford. He was Fellow and Lecturer of Hertford College, Oxford, from 1884 to 1887; and then a Student and Tutor of Christ Church, Oxford, from 1887 to 1894. He was Headmaster of Durham School from 1894 to 1899; Editor of The Guardian from 1900 to 1905; Chancellor of St Philip's Cathedral, Birmingham, from 1905 to 1913; Archdeacon of Aston from 1912 to 1913; and Archdeacon of Gloucester from 1917 to 1919.

He died on 30 October 1928.

References

External links 
Bibliographic directory from Project Canterbury

1862 births
People educated at Eton College
Alumni of Pembroke College, Oxford
Fellows of Hertford College, Oxford
Fellows of Christ Church, Oxford
Archdeacons of Aston
Archdeacons of Gloucester
1928 deaths
Walter